Jaroslav Švach (3 January 1973 – 28 May 2020) was a Czech football defender. He played in the Czech First League for Zlín, playing a total of eight seasons in the top flight.

Švach played international football at under-21 level for Czech Republic U21.

Švach died on 28 May 2020, at the age of 47, after suffering a stroke.

References

External links 

1973 births
2020 deaths
Czech footballers
Czech Republic under-21 international footballers
Czech First League players
FC Fastav Zlín players
Place of death missing
SFC Opava players
Czech expatriate footballers
Expatriate footballers in Kazakhstan
FC Zhenis Astana players
Association football defenders
Czech expatriate sportspeople in Kazakhstan